Harold Angus (1892–1979) was an Australian rugby league footballer for the Glebe club in the early years of the NSWRFL competition.

Playing career
A local junior, Angus was a tough forward who played for the Glebe Dirty Red's for many years and captained Glebe Reserve Grade sides to premiership victory in 1918 and 1919. He retired in the early 1920s.

Angus was often used as a first grade replacement player for Club Captain Frank Burge.

Death
Angus died in the Sutherland Shire on 17 August 1979 and was interred at Rookwood Cemetery on 20 August 1979.

References

Glebe rugby league players
Rugby league players from Sydney
1892 births
1979 deaths
Rugby league locks
Rugby league second-rows
Date of birth missing